Wilderness Boy is an historical, young adult novel by American writer Margery Evernden.

Set in 1794 in Washington County, Pennsylvania, just south of Pittsburgh, it tells the story of sixteen-year-old Jonathon Garrett, who while on an errand for his frontier doctor uncle, is accosted by local farmers and enlisted to join them in raising a Liberty Pole. The events of the Whiskey Rebellion soon unfold.

See also

Other novels that employ events of the Whiskey Rebellion:
The Latimers (1898)
The Delectable Country (1939)
The Whiskey Rebels (2008)

References

1955 American novels
American historical novels
American young adult novels
Novels set in Pennsylvania
Fiction set in 1794
Novels set in the 1790s